Charles Marks may refer to:
 Charles Ferdinand Marks, physician and politician in Queensland, Australia
 Charles E. Marks (1875–?), carpenter and general contractor in Madison, Wisconsin
 Charles Hardaway Marks (1921–2004), American attorney and politician
 Charlie Dale (Charles Marks, 1885–1971), member of the American vaudeville comedy duo Smith & Dale